Mayan-e Olya (also Romanized as Māyān-e ‘Olyā) is a village in Torqabeh Rural District, Torqabeh District, Torqabeh and Shandiz County, Razavi Khorasan Province, Iran. At the 2016 census, its population was 329, in 112 families.

References 

Populated places in Torqabeh and Shandiz County